The 1896 New Hampshire gubernatorial election was held on November 3, 1896. Republican nominee George A. Ramsdell defeated Democratic nominee Henry O. Kent with 61.41% of the vote.

General election

Candidates
Major party candidates
George A. Ramsdell, Republican
Henry O. Kent, Democratic

Other candidates
John C. Berry, Prohibition
Harry H. Acton, Socialist Labor
Gardiner J. Greenleaf, People's
George W. Barnard, Independent

Results

References

1896
New Hampshire
Gubernatorial